The 2021–22 Hannover 96 season was the 126th season in the football club's history and 26th overall and third consecutive season in the second flight of German football, the 2. Bundesliga. Hannover 96 will also participate in this season's edition of the domestic cup, the DFB-Pokal. This is the 63rd season for Hannover in the HDI-Arena, located in Hanover, Lower Saxony, Germany.

Players

Squad information

Out on loan

Transfers

In

Out

Friendly matches

Competitions

Overview

2. Bundesliga

League table

Results summary

Results by round

Matches

DFB-Pokal

Statistics

Appearances and goals

|}

Goalscorers

Clean sheets

Disciplinary record

References

Hannover 96 seasons
Hannover 96